Lattice degeneration is a disease of the human eye wherein the peripheral retina becomes atrophic in a lattice pattern and may develop tears, breaks, or  holes, which may further progress to retinal detachment. It is an important cause of retinal detachment in young myopic individuals. The cause is unknown, but pathology reveals inadequate blood flow resulting in ischemia and fibrosis.

Lattice degeneration occurs in approximately 6–8% of the general population and in approximately 30% of phakic retinal detachments. Similar lesions are seen in patients with Ehlers-Danlos syndrome, Marfan syndrome, and Stickler syndrome, all of which are associated with an increased risk of retinal detachment. Risk of developing lattice degeneration in one eye is also increased if lattice degeneration is already present in the other eye.

Treatment
Barrage laser is at times done prophylactically around a hole or tear associated with lattice degeneration in an eye at risk of developing a retinal detachment.  It is not known if surgical interventions such as laser photocoagulation or cryotherapy is effective in preventing retinal detachment in patients with lattice degeneration or asymptomatic retinal detachment. Laser photocoagulation has been shown to reduce risks of retinal detachment in symptomatic lattice degeneration. There are documented cases wherein retina detached from areas which were otherwise healthy despite being treated previously with laser.

References

External links 

Eye diseases